Maarika Võsu (born 7 June 1972) is an Estonian fencer. She competed in the individual and team épée events at the 1996 Summer Olympics.

References

External links
 

1972 births
Living people
Estonian female épée fencers
Olympic fencers of Estonia
Fencers at the 1996 Summer Olympics
Sportspeople from Tartu
20th-century Estonian women
21st-century Estonian women